Baron Lyle of Westbourne, of Canford Cliffs in the County of Dorset, was a title in the Peerage of the United Kingdom. It was created on 13 September 1945 for Sir Leonard Lyle, 1st Baronet, the former Member of Parliament for Stratford, Epping, and Bournemouth. He had already been created a Baronet, of Canford Cliffs in the County of Dorset, in the Baronetage of the United Kingdom on 22 June 1932. The title became extinct on the death of the second Baron in 1976.

The first Baron was the nephew of Sir Robert Lyle, 1st Baronet, and of Sir Alexander Lyle, 1st Baronet (see Lyle Baronets).

Barons Lyle of Westbourne (1945)
(Charles Ernest) Leonard Lyle, 1st Baron Lyle of Westbourne (1882–1954)
Charles John Leonard Lyle, 2nd Baron Lyle of Westbourne (1905–1976)

Arms

See also
Lyle Baronets

References

Extinct baronies in the Peerage of the United Kingdom
Noble titles created in 1945
Noble titles created for UK MPs